Christianity, Social Tolerance, and Homosexuality: Gay People in Western Europe from the Beginning of the Christian Era to the Fourteenth Century is a 1980 book about the history of Christianity and homosexuality by the historian John Boswell.

Summary

The work is divided into four parts: “Points of Departure”, “The Christian Tradition”, “Shifting Fortunes” and “The Rise of Intolerance”. In his introduction, Boswell discusses Derrick Sherwin Bailey's Homosexuality and the Western Christian Tradition (1955), which he describes as a "pioneering study" upon which almost all "modern historical research on gay people in the Christian West" has depended. However, he writes that it, "suffers from an emphasis on negative sanctions which gives a wholly misleading picture of medieval practice, is limited primarily to data regarding France and Britain, and has been superseded even in its major focus, biblical analysis."

Publication history
Christianity, Social Tolerance, and Homosexuality was published in 1980 by the University of Chicago Press. In 1981, the book appeared in paperback.

Reception
Christianity, Social Tolerance, and Homosexuality won a National Book Award and the Stonewall Book Award in 1981.

The historians George Chauncey and Martin Duberman, writing with the women's studies scholar Martha Vicinus, described Christianity, Social Tolerance, and Homosexuality as an "erudite study". They credited Boswell with providing "a revolutionary interpretation of the Western tradition", but noted that his premise that "a gay identity and gay people can be found throughout history" had been challenged as "essentialist" by social constructionists.

The political scientist Sheila Jeffreys argued that while Boswell covered material that "should provide fascinating insights into gender, power, and sexuality" he "avoids any such insights scrupulously." She criticized him for confusing "the abuse of slave children in prostitution" with "eroticism" and concluded that like other gay theorists he was guilty of "moral and political myopia."

The philologist Warren Johansson, the art historian Wayne R. Dynes and John Lauritsen criticized Boswell's thesis. They argued that Boswell had attempted to whitewash the historic crimes of the Christian Church against gay men.

References

Bibliography
Books

 
 
 
 

Online articles

 
 

1980 non-fiction books
American non-fiction books
Books about Christianity
Books by John Boswell
English-language books
University of Chicago Press books